Shaw House or Shaw Farm may refer to:

Singapore
Shaw House and Centre, Singapore

United Kingdom
Shaw House, Berkshire, England
Shaw House, Wiltshire, England

United States
 Tillman Shaw House, Fort Smith, Arkansas
 Gould-Shaw House, Cloverdale, California, listed on the NRHP in Sonoma County
 Shaw House (Ferndale, California)
 Shaw Mansion (New London, Connecticut)
 Shaw-Van Gilder House, Paris, Illinois
 Col. William T. and Elizabeth C. Shaw House, Anamosa, Iowa
 E.A. Shaw House, Davenport, Iowa
William M. Shaw House, Piscataquis County, Maine
 Shaw Mansion (Barton, Maryland)
 Thomas Mott Shaw Estate, Concord, Massachusetts
 Shaw–Hammons House, Anoka, Minnesota
 Cal Shaw Adobe Duplex, Tonopah, Nevada
 Cal Shaw Stone Row House, Tonopah, Nevada
 Shaw-Cude House, Colfax, North Carolina
 Shaw House (Shawboro, North Carolina)
 Shaw House (Southern Pines, North Carolina)
 Shaw Family Farms, Wagram, North Carolina
 Samuel Shaw Residence, Bath, Ohio, listed on the NRHP in Summit County
 Sylvester Shaw Residence, Bath, Ohio, listed on the NRHP in Summit County
 Shaw Farm (Ross, Ohio)
 Young-Shaw House, Sarahsville, Ohio
 Shaw–Dumble House, Hood River, Oregon
 Glenn W. Shaw House, Rapid City, South Dakota, listed on the NRHP in Pennington County
 Abner T. Shaw House, Goodlettsville, Tennessee
 Thomas and Marjorie Shaw House, Fort Worth, Texas, listed on the NRHP in Tarrant County
 Shaw House (Fairmont, West Virginia)
Shaw Farm (Bayfield County, Wisconsin)

See also
Shaw Farm (disambiguation)